Alvania mamillata is a species of minute sea snail, a marine gastropod mollusk or micromollusk in the family Rissoidae.

Description

Distribution

References

External links
 Arnaud, P. (1978). Révision des taxa malacologiques méditerranéens introduits par Antoine Risso. Annales du Muséum d'Histoire Naturelle de Nice. 5: 101-150

Rissoidae
Gastropods described in 1826